Nitidobulbon is a genus of orchids native to Mexico, South America and Central America. It has only three known species:

Nitidobulbon cymbidioides (Dodson, J.T.Atwood & Carnevali) Ojeda & G.A.Romero - Ecuador
Nitidobulbon nasutum (Rchb.f.) Ojeda & Carnevali - widespread from southern Mexico through much of Central America and the northern half of  South America
Nitidobulbon proboscideum (Rchb.f.) Ojeda & Carnevali - Venezuela

References

External links 

Yong Gee, Orchid Species Bulletin, Orchid Species Society (Brisbane, Australia), Nitidobulbon nasutum
IOSPE orchid photos, Maxillaria proboscidea Rchb.f. 1854, synonym of Nitidobulbon nasutum
Nitidobulbon nasutum video of a man holding a potted Nitidobulbon nasutum, describing it verbally in Portuguese

Maxillarieae genera
Maxillariinae